Democratic Republic of the Congo took part in the 2019 African Games held from 19 August to 31 August 2019 in Rabat, Morocco, with a total of 164 athletes competing in 17 sports, and won 12 medals (two silver medals and ten bronze medals). The country finished in 27th place in the medal table.

Medal summary

Medal table 

|  style="text-align:left; width:78%; vertical-align:top;"|

|  style="text-align:left; width:22%; vertical-align:top;"|

Archery 

Two athletes competed in archery.

Christ Kanza Diasonama competed in the men's individual event.

Ruth Yanfu Museta competed in the women's individual event.

They both also competed in the mixed team event.

Athletics 

In total eight athletes competed in athletics.

Badminton 

Six athletes were scheduled to compete in badminton.

Boxing 

Democratic Republic of the Congo competed in boxing.

Cycling 

The Democratic Republic of the Congo had six athletes who competed in cycling.

Fencing 

Jeanne Frebault won one of the bronze medals in the women's sabre event.

Handball 

The Democratic Republic of the Congo competed in both the men's tournament and women's tournament. The women's team won the bronze medal in their tournament and the men's team was eliminated in the men's quarter finals by Morocco.

Judo 

Eleven athletes competed in judo: Sarah Kafufula Bilengo, Corneille Boendo Mpak'Eangonda, Monica Bwanga Misenga, Dieu Ikoma Bokinda, Carole Imongo Kimberly, Prince Kosi Samuzu, Benny Mantota Mpaka and Bin Marco Mawesi.

Prince Kosi Samuzu won one of the bronze medals in the men's 100 kg event.

Karate 

Democratic Republic of the Congo competed in karate.

Swimming 

Three swimmers represented in the country in the sport.

Table tennis 

Ten athletes were scheduled to compete in table tennis.

Taekwondo 

Thirteen athletes are scheduled to compete in Taekwondo. Flore Mbubu won the bronze medal in the Women's -46 kg event.

Tennis 

Six athletes were scheduled to compete in tennis.

Weightlifting 

Four athletes were scheduled to compete in weightlifting.

Wrestling 

In total eleven athletes represented the country in wrestling. Aron Mbo Isomi won bronze medals in the Men's Greco-Roman 97 kg and Men's Freestyle 97kg events.

References 

Nations at the 2019 African Games
2019
African Games